Ulysses Norris, Jr. (born January 15, 1957) is a former professional American football player who played tight end for seven seasons for the Detroit Lions and Buffalo Bills.

1957 births
Living people
People from Monticello, Georgia
Sportspeople from the Atlanta metropolitan area
Players of American football from Georgia (U.S. state)
American football tight ends
Georgia Bulldogs football players
Detroit Lions players
Buffalo Bills players